Mikalay Zyanko (born 11 March 1989) is a Belarusian professional football player who plays for Orsha.

Career

Club
In February 2014 Zyanko signed for FC Slutsk, extending his contract the following January, before leaving the club by mutual agreement in January 2016.

In February 2016 Zyanko signed for FC Granit Mikashevichi, but left the club in July 2016 due to the club's financial problems, going on to sign for Moldovan club FC Milsami Orhei.

In August 2017 Zyanko returned to Belarus, signing for FC Slavia Mozyr, leaving the club at the end of the season following their relegation.

Career statistics

Club

Honors
Istiklol
 Tajikistan Football League champion: 2018
 Tajik Supercup winner: 2018

References

External links

1989 births
Living people
People from Orsha
Sportspeople from Vitebsk Region
Belarusian footballers
Association football forwards
Belarusian expatriate footballers
Expatriate footballers in Moldova
Expatriate footballers in Tajikistan
Belarusian expatriate sportspeople in Moldova
Belarusian expatriate sportspeople in Tajikistan
Tajikistan Higher League players
FC Belshina Bobruisk players
FC Minsk players
FC Rechitsa-2014 players
FC Dnepr Mogilev players
FC Slutsk players
FC Granit Mikashevichi players
FC Milsami Orhei players
FC Slavia Mozyr players
FC Istiklol players
FC Gorodeya players
FC Lida players
FC Krumkachy Minsk players
FC Smorgon players
FC Orsha players